Thrill is a Southeast Asian pay television channel focusing on the horror, thriller, suspense and supernatural fiction genres. It primarily airs imports from the United States, the United Kingdom, Australia, and Asia.

Programming
The channel airs many iconic horror film franchises including The Ring, Ju-on, The Amityville Horror, Friday the 13th, and The Blair Witch Project. Each month, a thematic block composed of first airings from contemporary and classic horror films is aired typically on Fridays at 11 PM (HK/SG/PHIL), 10 PM (JKT/THAI).

Thrill airs South Korean imports in partnership with South Korea's OCN channel; these include Vampire Prosecutor, The Virus and Cheo Yong The Paranormal Detective. Other programming Western dramas such as Psychoville, Coma, Bedlam and Holliston and paranormal reality series such as Ghost Hunters and Most Haunted.

Thrill airs its first original production Model Family which is premiered on October 31, 2020, at 9 PM. It also aired a 5-part series a year later, 3 AM which premiered at October 3, 2022.

Thrill's selected movies and TV series are also available on Astro via On Demand (ended in January 1, 2022), Film Wallet (in "KIX" brand, movies only) and DEGUP via Unifi TV in Malaysia.

Unlike other film-oriented channels which tend to be commercial-free, Thrill airs television advertising.

References 

Lionsgate subsidiaries
Television channels and stations established in 2010
Movie channels in the Philippines